Cabana Airstrip  is an airstrip located near Cabana and Heidoti in Suriname. The airstrip provides access to the Saramacca Development Project of IAMGOLD.

Charters and destinations 
Charter Airlines serving this airport are:

See also

 List of airports in Suriname
 Transport in Suriname

References 

Airports in Suriname